Attack on Baku is a 1942 German thriller film directed by Fritz Kirchhoff and starring Willy Fritsch, René Deltgen, and Fritz Kampers. The film was intended as anti-British propaganda during the Second World War. It is noted for its set designs by Otto Hunte, who showed a fascination for modern technology in his depiction of the oil town. The film was shot on location in German-allied Romania, and at Babelsberg Studio in Berlin.

Synopsis
Azerbaijan, 1919. The British hope to secure control of the vast oil fields around Baku by launching a series of terrorist attacks on them. Hans Romberg, a German who is working as a security officer, battles with the British chief agent Captain Forbes and his associates.

Cast

References

Bibliography

External links
 

1942 films
Films of Nazi Germany
1940s thriller films
German thriller films
1940s German-language films
Films directed by Fritz Kirchhoff
Films set in Baku
Films set in 1919
Nazi propaganda films
Russian Civil War films
Works about petroleum
German black-and-white films
Films shot at Babelsberg Studios
UFA GmbH films
Films shot in Romania
1940s German films